Jamal Ehsani (April 21, 1951 – February 10, 1998), was a Pakistani poet noted for his work in the ghazal form and was a favourite poet in the student's circle of Urdu literature. He has written three poetry books. After his death, his complete poetry work was published as a Kulliyaat-e-Jamal.

Early years
Jamal was born in Sargodha, Pakistan. He received his primary education there, and moved to Karachi in very young age. He continued his study in Karachi and worked in different fields. He died on February 10, 1998, in Karachi.

Literary career
Jamal's two poetry books were published in his life, and one after his death by support of Dr. Fatima Hasan.

Kulliyaat-e-Jamal
Kulliyaat-e-Jamal is a collection of complete poetry work by Jamal Ehsani, which includes his three poetry books, Sitara-e-Safar, Raat Ke Jaagey Huay and Taare Ko Mehtab Kia. The work was published posthumously, in 2008.

It was regarded as a best work of Urdu poetry by many Urdu poets, writers and critics. The poetry is sharp and influential as,

Bibliography
 Kulliyaat-e-Jamal کّلیاتِ جمال, Karachi
 Sitara-i-Safar ستارۂ سفر,Tabeer Publications Karachi,1982
 Raat Ke Jaagey Huay   رات کے جاگے ہوئے, Sindh Press Karachi,1986
 Taare Ko Mehtab Kia  تارے کو مہتاب کیا, Karachi

References

External links
جمال احسانی کراچی کے شاعر تھے

Pakistani poets
Urdu-language poets from Pakistan
Punjabi people
1951 births
1998 deaths
20th-century poets